Louis Gomis may refer to:
 Louis Gomis (boxer), French boxer who participated in the 1984 Olympics
 Louis Gomis (footballer born 1971), French-Senegalese footballer who played for OGC Nice
 Louis Gomis (footballer born 1974), Senegalese footballer who played for 1. FC Nuremberg